Cholesteryl chloride, also called 3-chlorocholest-5-ene or 3β-chlorocholest-5-ene, is an organic chemical, an organochloride derivate cholesterol. It is a liquid crystal material forming clockwise cholesteric liquid crystals. It is a transparent liquid, or a soft crystalline material with melting point around 94-96 °C.

It can be used with cholesteryl nonanoate, cholesteryl benzoate, and/or cholesteryl oleyl carbonate in some thermochromic liquid crystals.

It is used in some hair colors, make-ups, and some other cosmetic preparations.

It can be also used as a component of the liquid crystals used for liquid crystal displays.

References

Organochlorides
Cholestanes
Liquid crystals